Rio Rancho Estates is an unincorporated community and census-designated place (CDP) in Sandoval County, New Mexico, United States. It was first listed as a CDP prior to the 2020 census.

The CDP is in the southern part of the county, bordered to the east and south by the city of Rio Rancho. The southern border of the CDP partially follows the Bernalillo County line.

Demographics

Education 
Almost all of the CDP is in the Rio Rancho Public Schools. A very small section is in the Jemez Valley Public Schools.

References 

Census-designated places in Sandoval County, New Mexico
Census-designated places in New Mexico